William James Alfred Stroud (7 July 1919 – 5 October 2006) was a football player and coach who played as a wing half. Born in Hammersmith, Stroud played the first half of his professional career with Southampton, and later played for Leyton Orient, Newport County and Hastings United. He retired from professional football in 1954, after which he worked in coaching positions at former clubs Newport County and Southampton.

Life and career
Stroud was a product of youth football in Hampshire, and eventually signed as a youth player at Southampton in May 1938 at the age of 18. He signed professional terms with the club in February 1940, and during the break from competitive football due to World War II made almost 200 appearances and converted from a forward to a wing half. Despite this lengthy allegiance to the Saints, Stroud spent only the first season after the war with the club in the Second Division, making 29 league appearances and scoring four goals, mainly from the right side of the half back line.

In June 1947 Stroud joined Leyton Orient as part of a deal which saw full back Ted Ballard taking his place in the Southampton squad. First-team league football was similarly available for the wing half at the London club, and Stroud made 65 league appearances for the team in three seasons. In June 1950 he moved up to Welsh side Newport County for three seasons, and later finished his playing career with Southern League side Hastings United.

After retiring from playing, Stroud returned to Newport County as coach of the reserves team, where he remained for nine years before returning to Southampton to work as youth team assistant coach. During his 24-year stint with the Southampton Academy, Stroud assisted in the development of such legendary Saints players as Mick Channon, Matthew Le Tissier and Alan Shearer, before retiring in 1987 after briefly working as the coach for a Hants Intermediate XI team.

References

1919 births
Footballers from Hammersmith
2006 deaths
English footballers
English Football League players
Southampton F.C. players
Leyton Orient F.C. players
Newport County A.F.C. players
Hastings United F.C. (1948) players
Newport County A.F.C. non-playing staff
Southampton F.C. non-playing staff
Association football midfielders